The Adidas Al Rihla is a ball for association football produced by Adidas. It was the official match ball of the 2022 FIFA World Cup in Qatar. The ball contains a suspended inertial measurement unit inside its bladder that supplies the video assistant referee with instantaneous highly detailed ball movement data. The ball was designed for sustainability, being the first FIFA World Cup official match ball to be produced with environmentally-friendly inks and adhesives.

History 
Adidas unveiled Al Rihla on March 30, 2022. Al Rihla means The Journey in Arabic. Rihla is also a traditional genre of Arabic literature about journeys, such as the 14th century travelogue of Ibn Battuta, known simply as The Rihla.

To produce Al Rihla commercially, Adidas subcontracted Egyptian company Forward Egypt, a subsidiary of Pakistani company, Forward Sports. For souvenir sale, replicas of Al Rihla were also provided and produced by Adidas, but its production subcontracted to another company in Madiun, Indonesia, Global Way.

FIFA and Qatar Airways partnered with SpaceX on a Falcon 9 mission. On Eutelsat Hotbird 13F mission (launched in October 2022), the first stage B1069.3 included a hosted promotional payload by FIFA, that was a box powered by Starlink containing 2 Adidas Al Rihla balls, that were to be used in 2022 FIFA World Cup in Qatar.

Description 

Al Rihla's membrane is made of twenty seamless, thermally-bonded polyurethane panels. Its "Speedshell" surface is textured with debossed macro and micro patterns, meant to improve the ball's flight stability and swerve. Franziska Loffelmann, a design director at Adidas, describes Al Rihla as "the fastest and most accurate FIFA World Cup ball to date." Independent testing of the ball revealed that it has similar performance characteristics to the predecessor Telstar 18 and Brazuca balls.

The ball also features "connected ball technology," a suspension system inside the ball's bladder with an inertial measurement unit (IMU) at the center to provide the video assistant referee (VAR) with highly accurate ball movement data within seconds. This technology was developed with FIFA and Kinexon based in Munich.

According to FIFA, the visuals are inspired by the culture, architecture, boats and flag of Qatar. The blue, red, and yellow color scheme that is meant to represent the landscape of Qatar.
On the "Pro" version of the ball one can read "Football is..." and all around "teamwork - fair play - collective - responsibility - passion - respect" in six languages: English, Arabic, Mandarin Chinese, French, Spanish, and Esperanto.

Final matches – Al Hilm
The match ball for the 2022 FIFA World Cup Final was announced on 11 December 2022. It is a variation of the Al Rihla named the Adidas Al Hilm (a reference to "every nation's dream of lifting the FIFA World Cup").
Whilst the technical aspects of the ball are the same, the colour is different from the Al-Rihla balls used in the group stages and preceding knockout games, with a Gold Metallic, maroon, Collegiate Burgundy, and red design, a reference to the national colors of host nation Qatar and the golden colors shared by the Final's venue and the FIFA World Cup Trophy. The Al Hilm was used for the Semi-finals, 3rd position playoff and the final of the World Cup 2022. It is the fifth special ball for FIFA World Cup final matches, after the +Teamgeist Berlin (2006), Jo'bulani (2010), Brazuca final Rio (2014), and Telstar Mechta (2018).

Al Hilm has the same languages as Al Rihla, but in another configuration; this time it's Arabic with English, Mandarin, Spanish, French and Esperanto around.

References 

Adidas footballs
2022 FIFA World Cup
Products introduced in 2022